The second election to the Carmarthen Rural District Council was held in April 1898. It was preceded by the 1894 election and followed by the 1901 election. The successful candidates were also elected to the Carmarthen Board of Guardians.

There were unopposed returns in most wards at this election with some candidates withdrawing soon after nomination day to remove the need for a contest.

Ward Results

Abergwili (two seats)

Abernant (one seat)

Conwil (two seats)

Laugharne Parish (one seat)

Laugharne Township (one seat)

Llanarthney (two seats)

Llandawke and Llansadurnen (one seat)

Llanddarog (one seat)

Llandeilo Abercowyn and Llangynog (one seat)

Llanddowror (one seat)

Llandyfaelog (one seat)

Llanfihangel Abercowin (one seat)

Llangain (one seat)

Llangunnor (one seat)

Llanllawddog (one seat)

Llanpumsaint (one seat)

Llanstephan (one seat)

Llanwinio (one seat)

Merthyr (one seat)

Mydrim (one seat)

Newchurch (one seat)

St Clears (one seat)

St Ishmaels (one seat)

Trelech a'r Betws (two seats)

Carmarthen Board of Guardians

All members of the District Council also served as members of Carmarthen Board of Guardians. In addition six members were elected to represent the borough of Carmarthen. In 1898 all the sitting members were returned unopposed.

Carmarthen (six seats)

References

1898 Welsh local elections
Elections in Carmarthenshire
19th century in Carmarthenshire